The mesocortical pathway is a dopaminergic pathway that  connects the ventral tegmentum to the prefrontal cortex. It is one of the four major dopamine pathways in the brain. It is essential to the normal cognitive function of the dorsolateral prefrontal cortex (part of the frontal lobe), and is thought to be involved in cognitive control, motivation, and emotional response.

This pathway may be the brain system that is abnormal or functioning abnormally in psychoses, such as schizophrenia.  It is thought to be associated with the negative symptoms of schizophrenia, which include avolition, alogia and flat affect.  This pathway is closely associated with the mesolimbic pathway, which is also known as the mesolimbic reward pathway.

Other dopamine pathways
Other major dopamine pathways include:
 mesolimbic pathway
 nigrostriatal pathway
 tuberoinfundibular pathway

See also
 Dopamine
 Schizophrenia

References

External links
 Diagram

Central nervous system pathways
Dopamine